Fairfield High School is a  coeducational secondary school located in Peterchurch, Herefordshire, England.

Fairfield High School is located in the Golden Valley. It is situated among the communities of Peterchurch, Dorstone, Abbey Dore and Ewyas Harold.

The local environment lends itself to its house names: Dore (River Dore), Escley (Escley Brook), Monnow (River Monnow), Olchon (Olchon Valley) and Arrow .

Fairfield High School is one of the top state schools in the country. In the October 2013 Ofsted inspection, the school received the best possible score - "Outstanding"  in every category. The school converted to academy status in May 2014.

Curriculum 
Fairfield offers traditional subjects are provided alongside vocational learning opportunities.

Students in Key Stage 3 study:
 English and Literacy
 Mathematics
 Science
 Humanities (History, Geography, Ethics)
 Modern Foreign Languages (French, Spanish)
 Food Technology
 Art and Textiles
 Design & Technology
 Computer Science / Computing
 Performing Arts (Music, Drama)
 Physical Education
Students in Key Stage 4 may add vocational subjects:
 Religious Studies
 Animal Care
 Children's Play, Learning & Development
 Construction and the Built Environment
 Creative Crafts

Animals 
A large number of exotic and farm animals are kept at the school, including alpacas, rodents, reptiles, rabbits, guinea pigs, ferrets, sheep and goats. These are looked after by the students themselves as part of their learning for Key Stage 4 Animal Care studies.

Notable past pupils 
 Josie Pearson - Paralympic champion

References

Secondary schools in Herefordshire
Academies in Herefordshire